Knutbühren is a village in southern Lower Saxony, Germany.  It is a western borough of Göttingen.

Administratively, it forms a unit (here, Ortschaft) with Groß Ellershausen and Hetjershausen.

 
There were 129 residents in 2006.

Villages in Lower Saxony
Göttingen